Take the Cannoli: Stories From the New World is a collection of essays by Sarah Vowell, originally published by Simon & Schuster in 2000. In it, she discusses everything from her obsession with The Godfather (the title of the book comes from a line from Godfather caporegime Peter Clemenza), music lessons, and the intersection of Michigan and Wacker in Chicago to her experience retracing her ancestors' journey on the Trail of Tears and more.

Reception
The A.V. Club called the book a "surprisingly successful assessment of American life free from the trappings of grandiosity."

References

External links
Excerpt from The New York Times
Excerpt from The Guardian

2000 non-fiction books
Books by Sarah Vowell
Non-fiction books about The Godfather